James William Llewellyn Alford (15 October 1913 – 5 August 2004) was a Welsh track athlete who was born in Cardiff, Wales. In 1938 Alford won the Mile Empire Games gold medal in Sydney, becoming the first athlete in a Welsh vest to strike gold in the Empire Games. He was also a member of the British 4 x 1500 metre team that broke the world record. At home he won 11 Welsh titles in disciplines ranging from the 440 yards to cross country. He became first national coach for athletics in Wales in 1948 and is a member of the Welsh Sports Hall of Fame.

As a coach Jim Alford guided and advised many UK athletes to represent the UK and gain honours internationally.  He always had time to give to disadvantaged athletes, inspiring them to reach their potential.

He was the author and collaborator of several books and many articles, also translating many overseas books and articles into English.

He worked for the International Amateur Athletics Federation (IAAF) for a number of years, organising coaching forums and writing many articles.  He was greatly respected internationally and loved and appreciated by local athletes.

External links 

 Jim Alford 1938 Empire Games gold medallist dies at 90, obituary at IAAF, 9 August 2004 
 Obituary by Robert Cole in The Independent, 21 August 2004

Welsh male middle-distance runners
Sportspeople from Cardiff
Athletes (track and field) at the 1934 British Empire Games
Athletes (track and field) at the 1938 British Empire Games
Commonwealth Games gold medallists for Wales
Commonwealth Games medallists in athletics
1913 births
2004 deaths
Medallists at the 1938 British Empire Games